Goof Troop is an American animated sitcom television series produced by Walt Disney Television Animation. The series focuses on the relationship between single father Goofy and his son, Max, as well as their neighbors Pete and his family. Created by Robert Taylor and Michael Peraza Jr., the main series of 65 episodes aired in first-run syndication from 1992 to 1993 on The Disney Afternoon programming block, while an additional thirteen episodes aired on Saturday Mornings on ABC. A Christmas special was also produced, which aired in syndication in late 1992.

Walt Disney Pictures released two films that served as follow ups to the television series: the theatrical A Goofy Movie, released on April 7, 1995, as well as the direct-to-video sequel An Extremely Goofy Movie, released on February 29, 2000, as the series finale.

Premise
Goof Troop bears similarity to several early-1950s Goofy cartoon shorts which depicted Goofy as a father to a mischievous red-haired son. It was the creation of Michael Peraza Jr., and pitched to Disney management as a last minute idea to fit the title.

Goofy, a single father, moves back to his hometown of Spoonerville with his son, Max. As it happens, Goofy and Max end up moving in next door to Goofy's high school friend: Pete, a used car salesman and owner of Honest Pete's Used Cars; Pete's wife Peg, a real estate agent; and their two children, son P.J. (Pete Jr.) and younger daughter Pistol. Max and P.J. become best friends and do practically everything together. A large portion of the show's humor comes from Max's relatively normal personality sharply contrasting with his father.

Broadcast history and feature films
Goof Troop was originally previewed on The Disney Channel from April 20, 1992, into July 12 of that year. Like its predecessors DuckTales, Chip 'n Dale Rescue Rangers, TaleSpin and Darkwing Duck and its successor Bonkers, Goof Troop was previewed in syndication (on September 5, 1992) with a pilot television film, which later aired as a multi-part serial during the regular run. The series aired on The Disney Afternoon block of syndicated animated series during the 1992/1993 broadcast season; concurrent with the Disney Afternoon shows, another 13 episodes aired on Saturday mornings on ABC in 1992. Reruns of the series later aired on The Disney Channel (starting on September 3, 1996), and later on sister cable channel Toon Disney. Reruns were shown on Toon Disney until January 2005. The program made a return from September 2006 until August 2008, and the Christmas special aired on Christmas in the United States.

Goof Troop was adapted into the feature film A Goofy Movie (1995), which received mixed reviews but was a box office success. The film was followed by a direct-to-video sequel, An Extremely Goofy Movie (2000) and served as the finale to Goof Troop. The two films featured Bill Farmer, Rob Paulsen and Jim Cummings reprising their character roles from Goof Troop in these two films, with Jason Marsden providing the voice of an older Max. Dana Hill, who voiced Max in the series, commercials, promos, miscellaneous and other Disney projects, died on July 15, 1996, at the age of 32, after suffering a massive stroke related to her diabetes.

The Goof Troop premise was also incorporated into 1999's Mickey's Once Upon a Christmas and its 2004 sequel, Mickey's Twice Upon a Christmas, the former depicting Max at a much younger age preceding Goof Troop, while the latter continues Max's age progression to a young adult age.

Character and place titles
Pete's wife Peg is a play on "Peg Leg Pete," one of Pete's names in the Disney shorts. Likewise, his daughter Pistol is a play on another such name, "Pistol Pete."

The town of Spoonerville is named after layout artist J. Michael Spooner, who designed many of the background layouts for the series.

In "Axed by Addition," Max uses the "Doctor Howard, Doctor Fine, Doctor Howard" line to distract the doctors from performing surgery on PJ. This line was from the Three Stooges short, Men in Black.

Characters

Main

Goof Family
Goofer G. "G.G. Goofy" Goof (voiced by Bill Farmer) is the single father of Max Goof. In the pilot episode, he and his son move next door to the Petes from their trailer home in another city. Goofy's biggest weaknesses are his short attention span, scatterbrain, and clumsiness. He often drives his neighbor Pete up the proverbial wall. Goofy is very calm, lovable, and usually turns the other cheek when Pete insults him (or just doesn't realize he's been insulted). Occasionally, though, he does get angry and defensive toward Pete when the offense goes too far, but is very forgiving and still considers Pete to be his best friend no matter how often Pete is mean to him.
Maximilian "Max" Goof (voiced by Dana Hill), is the son and only child of Goofy. He is 11½ years old, and is in the same grade as his best friend P.J. at their junior high school. While he is generally active, alert and friendly, he can also be very cunning and/or coercive when pushed or tricked, sometimes on par with or even exceeding Pete. He loves his dad, and is close to him, but wishes he would be a little more normal, feeling at times embarrassed by his father's clumsy and doting behavior. His interests in the series include skateboarding, video games, rock music, girls, and outwitting bullies. According to an interview with Disney Adventures, voice actress Dana Hill used her normal speaking voice while portraying Max.
Waffles (vocal effects by Frank Welker) is the Goofs' male pet cat. He is often a victim of the various hi-jinks that go on between his owners and their neighbors, the Petes. At times, Waffles is sneaky, mischievous, and self-serving, often trying to find ways to please himself with either a little extra food or messing with the Petes' dog Chainsaw, with whom Waffles has an antagonizing relationship. Other times, he exhibits a more laid-back attitude, lazily lying about comfortably minding his own business, wanting nothing more than some peace and quiet isolated from all the surrounding craziness of the Goofs' and Petes' lives.

Pete Family
Peter P. Pete, Sr. (voiced by Jim Cummings) is a used-car salesman who lives with his beautiful spouse, Peg, and two children, his son P.J. and daughter Pistol. He and his family live next door to Goofy, whom Pete has known since childhood. He is dishonest, abrasive, cunning, and very stingy, often exploiting his goodhearted yet addled friend, Goofy, in his schemes to either get rich quick or better his own image. Though, his schemes often backfire, and at times does feel guilty about his horrible behavior and will work to set things right. His wife, Peg, often attempts to rid Pete of his uncouth attitude, and his son P.J. is the complete opposite of his father in behavior. In the series, he is both a co-protagonist and an anti-hero (though sometimes an anti-villain), viscerally hating Goofy most of time while tolerating and even helping him at other times.
Peg Pete (voiced by April Winchell) is Pete's spouse and the mother of both P.J. and Pistol. Peg works as a real estate agent in Spoonerville. Over the course of the series, Peg is shown to be a headstrong mother who is wise, quick-witted, sarcastic, and at times short-tempered and cantankerous when crossed. Despite her and Pete often clashing over his many underhanded schemes, she does love her husband dearly, with their quarrels serving as a means to bring Pete around and keep him in check, and has been faithfully married to him for at least twenty years. Unlike her husband, she is always happy to see Goofy and Max.
Peter Pete, Jr. (voiced by Rob Paulsen) is the eldest child of Pete and Peg, Pistol's older brother, and best friend of Max. He and Max are in the same grade and have a very strong brotherly friendship. He is generally shy and timid, but also sensitive and kindhearted. He is often encouraged by Max to take more risks and go along with his ideas to achieve their goals, and usually finds himself on the receiving end of his father's many schemes. He will often play the role of accomplice to those who plot to thwart his father (usually Peg or Max), but has occasionally proven to have enough wits to see through his father's plans on his own. Like Max, he enjoys skateboarding, bike-riding, video games, and rock music, but also has a personal interest in poetry. 
Pistol Pete (voiced by Nancy Cartwright) is the youngest child of Pete and Peg, and is P.J.'s younger sister. She is 4½–6 years old, and is in Kindergarten. Pete absolutely adores Pistol and gives her just about anything and everything she wants with little resistance. Pistol is very cute, hyperactive, and talks with a lisp. She is both a girly girl who loves tea parties, cute animals, baby dolls, and playing circus, and also has a tomboy streak in her fascination with speed, extreme flying, professional wrestling, bugs, and gross-out television. Pistol tends to get herself into mischief, leading to P.J., Max, Pete, and/or Goofy getting into trouble in their attempts to bail her out. Pistol is very talkative, often asking many questions in rapid succession, and constantly annoys or charms some of her fellow characters.
Chainsaw (vocal effects by Frank Welker) is the Petes' female and pet dog. A vicious and, at times, mean little thing, Chainsaw harbors a strong hatred towards the Goofs' cat, Waffles, whom she often chases and barks at. However, she will at times find herself on the receiving end of some of Waffles' antics as, when not fleeing in panic of her, he may exhibit a streak of cunning and cleverness that Chainsaw doesn't see coming. Other times, Chainsaw can be found minding her own business, burying random objects in the yard or sleeping in places around the living room. On rare occasions, she and Waffles may tolerate each other enough to actually get along for a little bit.

Other
The How-to Narrator is the snooty and instructive narrator of the classic "How-To" Goofy cartoons brought to life for the modern age by the voice of Corey Burton. He is heard in "Everything's Coming Up Goofy", "Unreal Estate", Goofin' Hood and his Melancholy Men", "The Ungoofables", "All the Goof That's Fit to Print", "Major Goof", "A Goof of the People", "Window Pains", "Gymnauseum", "To Catch a Goof", "Gunfight at the Okie-Doke Corral", "Goofin' Up the Social Ladder", "Sherlock Goof", and "Clan of the Cave Goof".
Danielle Wrathmaker (voiced by April Winchell), a TV news reporter who appears in "Close Encounters of the Weird Mime", "All the Goof That's Fit to Print", "Goof Fellas", and "The Good, the Bad and the Goofy".
Spud and Wally (voiced by Jerry Houser & Pat Fraley), are two criminals who literally steal Pete's house in "Nightmare on Goof Street", who make off with his RV in "O, R-V, I N-V U", and who hold him for a ransom in "The Good, the Bad and the Goofy", in which they are finally incarcerated. Even though they're dimwitted, they are described in the latter of the episodes as "two of the most wanted crooks in the country".
Brigadier General Robert E. Lee Sparrowhawk, Retired (voiced by William Windom) is a retired Army general who is Peg's "Uncle Bob" and the great-uncle of P.J. and Pistol. He appears only in "Major Goof".
Biff Fuddled (voiced by Rob Paulsen) is a TV personality for Spoonerville's local TV station KBOB T.V. and the host of such shows as Odd Facts, Strange Stuff, and Things Too Weird to Fake and The World's Most Painful Home Videos. He also reported the news once and hosted the Mrs. Spoonerville Society Semi-Biannual Househelper Contest. He appeared in "Close Encounters of the Weird Mime", "Slightly Dinghy", "Wrecks, Lies, and Videotape", and "Mrs. Spoonerville".
Earl of Earl's Auto (voiced by Frank Welker) is Pete's main rival car dealer of the series. Though he only appeared in person in "Rally Round the Goof", his presence is known throughout the series with Pete referring to him or his dealership, Earl's Auto, in such episodes as "Inspector Goofy" and "Goof Fellas".
The episode "Major Goof" features another of Pete's rivals, named Earl Yokel, who may or may not be the same person as Earl of Earl's Auto, as his design was quite different from how Earl of Earl's Auto looked in "Rally Round the Goof". In Pete's Day at the Races Earl looks like Maggot, which may be Earl
Tan Roadster (voiced by Joe Piscopo) is a longtime rival car dealer of Pete's, having known him for years. Athletic and physically fit, he makes wisecracks about Pete's overweight stature and tries to steal Peg away from him, finding himself attracted to her strong will. He and Pete compete for Peg's affections in the Mount Ladle Winter Games. He appears only in "Gymnauseum".
Harold Hatchback (voiced by Patrick Duffy) is another of Pete's rival car dealers. He and Pete compete to get a celebrity guest to appear in their dealership commercials. He recycles Biff Fuddled's animation model (meaning that he looks exactly like Biff) and appears only "Buddy Building".
Coop Hatchback (voiced by Conor Duffy, real-life son of Patrick Duffy) is the muscular son of Pete's rival Harold Hatchback, and friend of Max and P.J. He used to be known as "Coopie Hatchback", but changed his nickname after building his muscles. He saves Max and P.J. from Leech and unknowingly makes Max feel left out when P.J. begins to take more interest in Coop than he does in Max. In the end, the three of them all part on good terms with each other. His name is likely a pun on "hatchback coupe". He appears only in "Buddy Building".
Leech (voiced by Rob Paulsen) is a bully and small-time criminal who harasses little kids like Max and P.J., and often steals things from others. He appears in "Buddy Building" and "Maximum Insecurity".
The Chief of Police (voiced by Jim Cummings) is the no-nonsense chief of Spoonerville's police department. He appears in "Counterfeit Goof" "In Goof We Trust", "For Pete's Sake", "Maximum Insecurity", and "Buddy Building".
Mayor Baba (voiced by Jim Cummings in "Inspector Goofy", Brian Cummings in "Tub Be or Not Tub Be", and Bill Farmer in "In Goof We Trust" and "Window Pains") is the Mayor of Spoonerville. He appears in "Inspector Goofy", "Tub Be or Not Tub Be", "In Goof We Trust", and "Window Pains" (the latter of which he looks like a completely different person from how he looked in all his other episode appearances). In the episode "A Goof of the People", Goofy himself is elected the Mayor of Spoonerville.
Giblet the Clown (voiced by Frank Welker) is a red-nosed clown with red lips and hair, a party hat and tie, a car horn, and a green suit. He sells balloons at the Spoonerville Aviation Fair in "Hot Air", works with the Circus Ringmaster in "Three Ring Bind", and sells balloon animals (while also assisting both Max and movie star Ronald Streudelnossher with their respective problems) at Lake Zester in "Buddy Building". Giblet is often seen as abrasive and rather self-serving towards everyone including kids, like Pistol.
The Circus Ringmaster (voiced by Corey Burton) is the main antagonist in the episode "Three Ring Bind", in which he and Giblet try to sell their circus's animals to be made into puppy chow. He and Pistol become bitter enemies after the latter comes to the circus, plays with his animals, and then brings the animals home with her.
Douglas Twinkmeyer (voiced by Rob Paulsen) is a student at Spoonerville Jr. High School. A know-it-all who's called "Twinky" in gym class, he was formerly the most respected kid in school for being the chief of the Safety patrol. But after being exposed as the mastermind behind a plan to corner the market on a certain baseball card's value, which involved two bullies beating kids up for their money, he was reassigned to patrol Pistol's preschool. He is featured in "Lethal Goofin'", but can also be seen in the background of several other episodes.
Tooth and Nails (voiced by S. Scott Bullock and Candi Milo) were Douglas's bully henchmen who helped him carry out his plan by taking other kids' money so the two could buy all of the students' Lefty McGuffin baseball cards for Douglas to destroy, making his own Lefty McGuffin card the only one in existence. They were stopped by Max and P.J., with Tooth and Nails being sentenced to two weeks of clapping erasers in detention hall. They are featured in "Lethal Goofin'", but can also be spotted in the background in other episodes.
Dutch Spackle (voiced by Charles Nelson Reilly in "Unreal Estate" & Michael Bell in "A Pizza the Action") is a handyman Peg hires in "Unreal Estate" to help Pete fix up their lake house so she can sell it, but Pete fires Dutch to replace him with Goofy after Pete spends most of Dutch's work fee on a new fishing device. Later, in "A Pizza the Action", Dutch is seen as a truck driver sent to tow the Goofs' house away after their pizza business failed, but ends up towing the Petes' house instead after a mix up.
Bubbles (voiced by Jennifer Darling) is a friendly, green pigmented, dragon-like dinosaur that hatches from an egg found by Max at Spoonerville's lake. Bubbles's gender was presumed by Max to be female, but Pistol used male pronouns (In the book adaptation, Bubbles is male). After she hatches, Max tries hiding Bubbles in his and Goofy's basement, but Goofy soon finds out about Bubbles after she grows bigger and bigger. Once she gets too big, Max and P.J. try to hide her from Pete, but Pistol finds out about Bubbles and helps expose her to Pete, who chases Bubbles through town after she had eaten his favorite chair. In the end, Goofy finds Bubbles's mother and helps her to save Bubbles from Pete. Bubbles and her mother return to the lake where she and Max bid farewell to one another.

Goof History cast
The "Goof History" episodes saw Goofy relating stories to Max from the family photo album about their various ancestors and family members, and also featured historical counterparts to several of the show's present-day main characters and supporting characters.

Goof family members
Sir Goofy of Knock-Knees A.K.A. Goofin' Hood, the greatest bowman in all of England, is Max's great-great-great-great-great-great-great-great-great-great-granddad, and a spoof of Robin Hood. He appears in the episode "Goofin' Hood and his Melancholy Men".
Eliot Goof, an iceman-turned-FBI-agent, is Max's great-uncle, and a spoof of Eliot Ness from The Untouchables. He appears in the episode "The Ungoofables".
Sherlock Goof, a rat-catcher-turned-detective, is Max's Great-Great-Great Uncle and a spoof of Sherlock Holmes. He appears in the episode "Sherlock Goof". In 1993, Sherlock Goof made a second appearance in a French-original Goof Troop (or La Bande à Dingo) comic strip titled "L'Oncle Sherlock" ("Uncle Sherlock" in English), published in Issue #2165 of Le Journal de Mickey. In this story, Sherlock Goof (named "Sherlock Dingo"; the same name that he has in the French dub of the episode) has become a more legitimate detective since his debut in the episode.
Mopalong Goofy, a near-sighted janitor-turned-sheriff, is Max's great-great-great-grandpa, and a spoof of Hopalong Cassidy. He appears in the episode, "Gunfight at the Okie-Doke Corral".
Caveman Goof, an inventor, is Max's and Goofy's ancestor from prehistoric times. He appears in the very last episode of the series, "Clan of the Cave Goof".

Goof History supporting cast
Fester (voiced by Michael Gough) is a character exclusive to the Goof History episodes. He is usually, but not always, the sidekick of the episode's Goof family member. In "Goofin' Hood and his Melancholy Men", he is the unnamed leader of the Melancholy Men (before Goofin' Hood, that is). In "The Ungoofables", he is FBI agent Fester Ness. In "Sherlock Goof", he is Inspector Lestrade. In "Gunfight at the Okie-Doke Corral", he is Fester Swollen. And in "Clan of the Cave Goof", he is an unnamed dentist.
Sir Pete is Pete's historical counterpart in "Goofin' Hood and his Melancholy Men", being the sheriff of Halfbakedham and a parody of the Sheriff of Nottingham.
Prince Freddy (voiced by Frank Welker) is a parody of Prince John from "Goofin' Hood and his Melancholy Men, being the evil cousin of King Richard who seizes the throne from him and takes control of the kingdom of Halfbakedham.
King Richard the Chicken-hearted (voiced by Jim Cummings) is Mayor Baba's historical counterpart in "Goofin' Hood and his Melancholy Men", and a parody of King Richard.
Princess Pistol is Pistol's historical counterpart in "Goofin' Hood and his Melancholy Men", and is the daughter of King Richard. Goofin' Hood helps her to take back her father's kingdom from Prince Freddy and Sir Pete.
Frank Nutti is Pete's historical counterpart in "The Ungoofables", the most notorious crime boss of Chicago in 1929, and a parody of Frank Nitti.
Peg Doll is Peg's historical counterpart in "The Ungoofables", and Frank Nutti's partner, who is the brains of their criminal operations.
Professor Inferiority is Pete's historical counterpart in "Sherlock Goof", and a parody of Professor Moriarty.
Sparky (voiced by Frank Welker) is a little mouse whom Sherlock Goof tries to catch before he becomes Sherlock's sidekick. He appears in "Sherlock Goof".
Sir Reginald (voiced by Jim Cummings) is Mayor Baba's historical counterpart in "Sherlock Goof", and likely a parody of Sir Reginald Bailey from the 1942 film Sherlock Holmes and the Secret Weapon.
Dr. Watson (voiced by Frank Welker) is an ally of Sherlock Goof and a parody of Dr. John Watson.
Snibbs (voiced by Rob Paulsen) is Sir Reginald's French butler. He appears in "Sherlock Goof".
Toynbee (voiced by Jim Cummings) is one of Professor Inferiority's bumbling henchmen. He appears in "Sherlock Goof".
Isadore Eyesore (voiced by Frank Welker) is an optometrist who helps Mopalong Goofy get new glasses in "Gunfight at the Okie-Doke Corral".
Miss Lily is Peg's historical counterpart in "Gunfight at the Okie-Doke Corral", and a saloon girl at the Lucky 7 Saloon.
Pecos Pete is Pete's historical counterpart in "Gunfight at the Okie-Doke Corral", and an 1867 Western outlaw who comes to Dodge Ball City (a parody of Dodge City, Kansas) every six months to shoot its sheriff dead. Despite being a villain, his name comes from Pecos Bill.
Chief Pete is Pete's historical counterpart in "Clan of the Cave Goof", and is the chief of Caveman Goof's tribe. He gave Caveman Goof his job as an inventor, and has a fear of the dentist.
Chief Pete's wife is Peg's historical counterpart in "Clan of the Cave Goof", who cooks meals for her husband after Caveman Goof invents fire, and who insists that her husband see the dentist after he eats too many sweets.
Additionally, Pistol has a few unnamed historical counterparts in "The Ungoofables" (a five-year-old bystander and a papergirl), "Sherlock Goof" (another papergirl), and "Clan of the Cave Goof" (the keeper of the Cave of Knowledge).
Likewise, Mayor Baba has two historical counterparts who share the same name: the 1929 mayor of Chicago in "The Ungoofables" and the 1867 mayor of Dodge Ball City in "Gunfight at the Okie-Doke Corral".

Additional voice cast
 Kath Soucie as Debbie, Max's cousin and Goofy's niece
 Jerry Houser as Duke, the leader of The Pharaohs, a gang of high school teenagers
 Gary Owens as Mr. Hammerhead
 Andrea Martin as Mrs. Willoughby
 Tino Insana as Colonel Carter
 Joe Piscopo as Tan Roadster, Myron "The Incredible Bulk" Brogan
 Charlie Adler as Magician's hat, Igor, Street Theatre Teacher, Moe
 Nancy Cartwright as Melvin – A member of Spoonerville Jr. High's safety patrol.
 Dorian Harewood as Buster – a friendly guitar-playing hobo who lives in the city.
 Bill Farmer as Dr. Frankengoof – Goofy's great-uncle from the Old Country and the creator of the Frankengoof Monster.
 Jim Cummings as the Frankengoof Monster, Mr. Braxton
Eddie Deezen as Road Hogs Biker
Richard Karron as S. Slick

Episodes

Accolades

Cameos/Other appearances
 Goofy, Pete, Max, and P.J. makes an appearance in the Bonkers episode "Cartoon Cornered".
 In addition to the animated series, Goof Troop was adapted into various comic strips, which were printed in several Disney comic books, such as Disney Adventures and Disney's Colossal Comics Collection. Two of these strips were also adapted into storybook form as the Goof Troop: Junior Graphic Novel.
 P.J., Max, and Pistol make a cameo appearance in the 2011 Disney's Darkwing Duck comic book series published by Boom! Studios. However, when the series was republished by Joe Books as the Disney's Darkwing Duck: The Definitively Dangerous Edition, their cameo appearance was removed and replaced by a new cameo appearance for Sid from Toy Story (presented as an anthropomorphic animal person instead of a normal human) and Lampwick from Pinocchio (presented as an anthropomorphic donkey child instead of a human child turned into an ordinary donkey). 
 In the 2017 DuckTales series, the city of Spoonerville is mentioned in the first episode, "Woo-oo!", as one of the many other cities where Scrooge McDuck has numerous investments. Goofy appears in the season 3 episode "Quack Pack!". Max and PJ have non-speaking appearances in photographs. Roxanne from A Goofy Movie also appears in a photograph.
 Goofy and Max appeared in the Mickey's Starland Show attraction at The Magic Kingdom starting in 1992, and remained there until the closing of the attraction in 1996. The show focused on characters from The Disney Afternoon, and included a Goof Troop segment.

Home media

VHS releases
On February 26, 1993, Disney released three VHS cassettes of the series in the United States, titled "Banding Together", "Goin' Fishin, and "The Race is on!". They included the episodes "Shake, Rattle & Goof", "Close Encounters of the Weird Mime", "Slightly Dinghy", "Wrecks, Lies & Videotape", "Meanwhile, Back at the Ramp", and "Tub Be or Not Tub Be". The videotapes included a Goof Troop music video which played at the end of each tape.

Additionally, on September 28, 1993, the Goof Troop episode "Have Yourself a Goofy Little Christmas" was released together with the Darkwing Duck episode "It's a Wonderful Leaf" on one VHS cassette as a special release called Happy Holidays with Darkwing Duck and Goofy! On October 5, 1993, the Goof Troop episode "Hallow-Weenies" was released together with the Chip 'n Dale Rescue Rangers episode "Ghost of a Chance" on one VHS cassette as a special release called Boo-Busters. The episode "FrankenGoof" was released with the DuckTales episode "Ducky Horror Picture Show" on another special VHS release titled Monster Bash.

Australia and New Zealand releases
On November 26, 1993, three VHS cassettes containing 6 episodes of the series were released in Australia and New Zealand.

DVD releases
On February 14, 2006, Walt Disney Studios Home Entertainment released Goof Troop: Volume 1 on DVD in Region 1. This one-disc release features three episodes, including "Slightly Dinghy", "Wrecks, Lies & Videotape", and "Shake, Rattle & Goof", with no bonus material. Many fans did not buy Goof Troop Volume 1 because it has only three episodes and additional episodes were only available on VHS. At the time, many fans were still waiting for Disney to put out Goof Troop Volume 1 again with more episodes. The DVD release of A Goofy Movie features one episode titled "Calling All Goofs", but the intro is removed. A Disney Movie Club exclusive DVD titled "Have Yourself A Goofy Little Christmas" contains the holiday special of the same name.

In 2013, Disney Movie Club released two new volumes of Goof Troop on DVD. Each volume released from the Disney Movie Club includes 27 episodes of the show for a total of 54 episodes released, leaving 25 unreleased episodes to go.

Goof Troop Volumes 1 and 2, in addition to "Have Yourself a Goofy Little Christmas", had a wider retail DVD release in January 2015 and were Wal-Mart Exclusives in Canada ahead of that wider release date.

Video on demand
The entire series (barring the curious absence of the episode "Counterfeit Goof") is currently available in HD for purchase on Amazon Prime Video, Google TV and the iTunes Store with the episodes being split into five volumes/seasons.

The series has been available to stream on Disney+ since its launch on November 12, 2019, with the exception of the stand-alone holiday special "Have Yourself a Goofy Little Christmas".

It was also previously available on the DisneyLife streaming service in the UK, including the episode "Counterfeit Goof" which is missing on other streaming platforms. DisneyLife has since been rebranded into Disney+, upon on the latter service's launch in that region on March 24, 2020.

Books
Goof Troop: Great Egg-Spectations
Goof Troop: Goin' Gold-Fishing
Goof Troop: The Junior Graphic Novel

Legacy
Goof Troop has had a lasting impact on Goofy and Pete’s careers, as their later appearances throughout the 90s to the mid-2000s were built on the show's status quo. These include A Goofy Movie, Mickey's Once Upon a Christmas, An Extremely Goofy Movie, Mickey Mouse Works, House of Mouse and Mickey's Twice Upon a Christmas, all of which feature Goofy and Pete's respective families as major characters. Goofy and Pete also appeared on Bonkers and Raw Toonage in their Goof Troop designs.

In the DuckTales reboot series' premiere episode, Spoonerville is mentioned amongst a number of locations that Scrooge McDuck's company, McDuck Enterprises, conducts business in. In the season three episode "Quack Pack!", Goofy in his Goof Troop design appears as a guest character as part of a 1990s sitcom the Duck Family had become trapped in. Max and P.J. also make non-physical appearances via Goofy's family pictures.

Adaptations
A video game very loosely based on the series was released for the Super Nintendo Entertainment System sometime in July 1993.

Two films loosely based on Goof Troop were made years after the show's end. The first film, A Goofy Movie, was released on April 7, 1995. The second film, An Extremely Goofy Movie, was released on video on February 29, 2000.

In other languages
 Danish: Max og Mule (English: Max and Goofy)
 German: Goofy und Max
 French: La Bande à Dingo
 Finnish: Hopon poppoo (English: Goofs group)
 Italian: Ecco Pippo!
 Japanese:『パパはグーフィー』(Papa wa Gūfī) (English: Papa Is Goofy)
 Swedish: Långbens galna gäng (English: Goofy's crazy gang)
 Norwegian: Langbein og sønn (English: Goofy and son)
 Polish: Goofy i inni
 Português: A Pandilha do Pateta, A Turma do Pateta e A Trupe do Pateta
 Russian: Гуфи и его команда
 Spanish: La tropa Goofy (English: Goofy's Troop)

Notes

References

External links

 
 
 
 Goof Troop at Don Markstein's Toonopedia. Archived from the original on August 28, 2016.

 
Goofy (Disney)
1990s American animated television series
1990s American sitcoms
1992 American television series debuts
1993 American television series endings
American animated sitcoms
American Broadcasting Company original programming
American children's animated comedy television series
The Disney Afternoon
Disney Channel original programming
Television about Bigfoot
English-language television shows
First-run syndicated television programs in the United States
Animated television series about children
Animated television series about dogs
Television series by Disney Television Animation
Television shows adapted into comics
Television shows adapted into video games